Harry Harding is a Canadian politician in Newfoundland and Labrador, Canada. He represented the district of Bonavista North in the Newfoundland and Labrador House of Assembly from 2002 to 2011 as a member of the Progressive Conservative Party.

After the death of Municipal Affairs Minister Dianne Whalen in October 2010 Premier Danny Williams appointed Harding to Cabinet as the Minister responsible for Government Services, taking over for Kevin O'Brien who succeeded Whalen.

Electoral results

|-

|-

|-

|NDP
|E. Howard Parsons
|align="right"|80
|align="right"|1.88%
|align="right"|
|}

|-

|-

|-

|NDP
|E. Howard Parsons
|align="right"|116
|align="right"|2.00%
|align="right"|+1.42%
|}

|-

|-

|-

|NDP
|E. Howard Parsons
|align="right"|35
|align="right"|0.58%
|align="right"|+0.58%
|}

References

Progressive Conservative Party of Newfoundland and Labrador MHAs
Living people
21st-century Canadian politicians
Year of birth missing (living people)